The church of San Tommaso in Formis is a small church in Rome, situated on the Caelian Hill.

History
Situated on the edge of Villa Celimontana and next to the Arch of Dolabella (Porta Caelimontana), a gate in the original Servian Wall, the church is dedicated to St. Thomas the Apostle. It is built into the side of the Claudian Aqueduct, from which comes in formis (forma claudia is Latin for the Claudian Aqueduct).

The church is believed to date back to the 10th Century, although the first certain date of its existence is 1209, when Pope Innocent III gave ownership of the church with the attached monastery to the Trinitarian Order whose founder, Saint John of Matha, lived there and made it the Order's headquarters. He adapted part of the monastery to become a hospital.  Saint Francis of Assisi often stayed at the monastery.
Around 1380 the Order was forced to leave Rome.  In time, under the control of the Vatican, the complex became more or less abandoned. In 1532 the first steps towards restoration were undertaken and in 1571 Pope Pius V returned the church, hospital and monastery to the Trinitarians. In 1590, following the death of Pius V, the church reverted once again to the Vatican and, in 1663, was completely reconstructed to its present form. It was not returned to the Trinitarian Order until 1898 on occasion of the 700th anniversary of the Order’s foundation. Use of the church and buildings was given in perpetuity on 27 March 1920. The hospital was demolished in 1925.

The northeast façade of the complex has a Romanesque entrance with a 13th Century mosaic by Lorenzo Cosmati of Christ between two freed slaves. The mosaic also depicts the Seal of the Trinitarian Order. The founding intention for the Order was the ransom of Christians held captive by non-Christians during the time of the Crusades.

See also
Bill Thayer's Web Site (Gazetteer of Rome)

References

Trinitarian Order
Roman Catholic churches in Rome
Tommaso Formis